"Nico and the Niners" is a song written and recorded by the American musical duo Twenty One Pilots. It was released on July 11, 2018 as one of the singles from their fifth studio album Trench (2018), alongside "Jumpsuit". The song peaked at No. 79 on the US Billboard Hot 100 chart.

Composition 
"Nico and the Niners" is a reggae, rap, rock and psychedelic song with a length of three minutes and forty-seven seconds. It features a rap verse, some vocal audio clips played backwards and a section with a reversed drum beat. Additionally, there are sections using a vocoder effect on clips of the vocals.  It was the first song to be completed off Trench. The song is played in an A minor key, and at 140 beats per minute.

Music video
A music video for "Nico and the Niners" was released on July 26, 2018. It was directed by Andrew Donoho, who had directed all the music videos from the Trench trilogy, and was filmed in Kharkiv and Kyiv, Ukraine.

The video shows singer Tyler Joseph packing a backpack and meeting drummer Josh Dun in a faded city (known as Dema) square, where they shake hands before joining a group of torch-wielding rebels (called the "Banditos") and perform the song. The video veers between that mysterious thread and the mystical activities of mysterious red-hooded robed figures (also known as the bishops). At the end of the video, two children discover a Bandito's lost gear, but turn to see the nine bishops, the leaders of Dema, walking towards them.

Commercial performance
"Nico and the Niners" made its debut on the Bubbling Under Hot 100 Singles chart at No. 6 and Hot Rock Songs at No. 9 with 19,000 sold. The song peaked at No. 79 on the Billboard Hot 100, and peaked at No. 7 on the Hot Rock Songs chart. The song also peaked at No. 88 on the UK Singles Chart.

Track listing

Personnel
 Tyler Joseph – lead vocals, keyboards, bass, synthesizers, guitar, programming, ukulele, production, songwriting
 Josh Dun – drums, percussion, backing vocals
 Adam Hawkins – mixing

Charts

Weekly charts

Year-end charts

Certifications

References 

Twenty One Pilots songs
Songs written by Tyler Joseph
2018 songs
2018 singles
Fueled by Ramen singles
Reggae songs
American hip hop songs
American rock songs
Psychedelic songs
Music videos shot in Ukraine